Tamás Tiefenbach (born 25 December 1972) is a Hungarian football coach and a former striker. He is an assistant coach with Austrian club SC Austria Lustenau.

References

1972 births
Living people
Hungarian footballers
Újpest FC players
FC St. Gallen players
SC Austria Lustenau players
FC Admira Wacker Mödling players
Association football forwards
Swiss Super League players
Austrian Football Bundesliga players
Tamas, Tiefenbach
Expatriate footballers in Switzerland
Hungarian expatriate sportspeople in Switzerland
Expatriate footballers in Austria
Hungarian expatriate sportspeople in Austria
Hungarian football managers
Hungarian expatriate football managers
Expatriate football managers in Austria
SC Austria Lustenau managers
Footballers from Budapest